Dollars and Sense was a Canadian business affairs television series which aired on CBC Television from 1972 to 1975.

Premise
Gordon Jones hosted this Toronto-produced series concerned business topics including finance and labour.

Scheduling
This half-hour series was broadcast on Sundays at 1:00 p.m. (Eastern) for three seasons. Its first season was from 1 October 1972 to 10 June 1973, its second season was from 30 September 1973 to 16 June 1974 while its third season was shorter, from 5 January to the final episode on 29 June 1975.

See also
Venture

References

External links
 

CBC Television original programming
1972 Canadian television series debuts
1975 Canadian television series endings
Television shows filmed in Toronto